Anne Namara Kabagambe is a Ugandan international development and finance executive who is a former executive director of the International Bank for Reconstruction and Development World Bank Group's Africa Group 1 constituency. She currently serves on the board of Barrick Gold Corporation.

Early life and education
Kabagambe was born in Kisoro, a town in the southwestern region of Uganda near the borders with Rwanda and the Democratic Republic of the Congo, as the eighth of twelve children to a regional government official and a stay-at-home mother. She completed her secondary education in Uganda before moving to the United States, where she obtained an undergraduate degree from the University of California at San Diego. She later obtained Master's degrees in international relations from Columbia University and in public policy from the George Washington University. She also obtained diplomas in strategic public-sector negotiations from the John F. Kennedy School of Government at Harvard University, and in leadership and management from the Cranfield School of Management.

Career

Early career and African Development Bank
Kabagambe began her career representing the City of New York on trade and investment opportunities in China, India and the Middle East. She also worked for the United Nations and the Third World Institute in New York City. In 1989, Kabagambe joined the African Development Bank, where she eventually rose to her final position as chief of staff and director of cabinet. She worked as part of the team tasked with the formulation of the Bank's long-term strategy, and also played a role in its responses to the financial crisis of 2007–08 and the Western African Ebola virus epidemic. In January 2016, she joined the board of trustees at the Africa-America Institute.

World Bank
In November 2018, Kabagambe was elected to the position of executive director of the World Bank Group's Africa Group 1 Constituency—which represents Botswana, Burundi, Eritrea, Eswatini, Ethiopia, the Gambia, Kenya, Lesotho, Liberia, Malawi, Mozambique, Namibia, Rwanda, Seychelles, Sierra Leone, Somalia, South Sudan, Sudan, Tanzania, Uganda, Zambia and Zimbabwe—after having previously served as the constituency's alternate executive director. She became the second woman to hold the position after Ethiopia's Mulu Ketsela. Kabagambe also serves as co-chair of the World Bank Board's working group on gender and is a member of the Board's committees of budget and development effectiveness.

Personal life
Kabagambe has a son, William Teli Muhumuza Keita Kabagambe. She is fluent in both English and French.

References

Living people
21st-century Ugandan businesswomen
21st-century Ugandan businesspeople
Ugandan people in finance
People from Kisoro District
University of California, San Diego alumni
Columbia University alumni
George Washington University alumni
Harvard Kennedy School alumni
Alumni of Cranfield University
World Bank Group people
Year of birth missing (living people)
20th-century Ugandan businesswomen
20th-century Ugandan businesspeople